Tivi is a village and municipality in the Ordubad Rayon of Nakhchivan, Azerbaijan.

Tivi may also refer to:
Tiv people or Tivi, an ethnic nation in West Africa
, a Finnish computer magazine published by Alma Media

People with the given name
 Tivi Etok, a Canadian Inuit artist

See also
 TV
 Tiwi (disambiguation)